The Berry Brook is a stream close to Sonning Eye in the flood plain of the River Thames, in southern Oxfordshire, England.

The stream flows northeast from close to the Redgrave-Pinsent Rowing Lake, parallel with the A4155 Henley Road out of Caversham, Reading towards Henley-on-Thames. It flows under the B478 Playhatch Road close to Playhatch and the Sonning Works owned by Lafarge. The stream passes under Spring Lane by the Flowing Spring public house, also near Playhatch. It then flows through farmland owned by Phillimore estate, entering the River Thames at Hallsmead Ait just south of Shiplake.

Berry Brook Boats is located at the Thames and Kennet Marina, close to the source of Berry Brook.

See also 
 Tributaries of the River Thames

References 

Rivers of Oxfordshire
1Berry